The Homelander (John Gillman) is a character and one of the main antagonists of the comic book series The Boys and the media franchise of the same name, created by Garth Ennis and Darick Robertson. The character is depicted as an egotistical and sadistic narcissist who serves as the extremely powerful leader of The Seven—a group of corrupt and hedonistic superheroes funded by Vought-American—and the archenemy of Billy Butcher. Beneath his public image as a noble and altruistic hero, the Homelander cares little about the well-being of those he professes to protect.

In the Amazon Prime Video television adaptation developed by Eric Kripke, the character (simply known as The Homelander) is portrayed by Antony Starr. This version is the megalomaniacal son of Soldier Boy and the father of Ryan Butcher (having committed many of the acts of Black Noir in the comic series, most notably the rape of Billy Butcher's wife). Homelander has also appeared in the spin-off and promotional web series The Boys Presents: Diabolical and Death Battle!, respectively.

Appearances

Comic book series
The Homelander is a patriotic superhero who leads the superhero team, The Seven, and the most powerful superhuman created by Vought-American. The company's cover story for the Homelander is that he is an alien who landed in the United States as an infant, much like Superman. In reality, he was grown in a secret laboratory, the progeny of genetic material taken from Stormfront, who was injected with Compound V while still a member of the Hitler Youth. Homelander spent most of his young life chained down with a hydrogen bomb strapped to him in case he tried to escape. His mother was a mentally disabled woman who died giving birth to him.

Homelander remains under the financial thumb of VA, as their money funds the Seven's hedonistic lifestyle. Homelander eventually tries to encourage the other superheroes to do what they want, but relents due to his fear towards his boss, "The Guy From Vought" (James Stillwell).

Until the events of the series' climax, it is implied that Homelander had raped Billy Butcher's wife, Becky, who then died giving birth to a superhuman baby Billy had then killed. In Issue #40, the Boys receive a series of incriminating photos seemingly showing Homelander engaging in grisly acts of murder, cannibalism, and necrophilia against men, women, and children. In private, Homelander shows signs of suffering a mental breakdown, talking to his own reflection in a mirror, and having bouts of nausea. He eventually decides that he is damned anyway for the acts depicted in the photos, and decides to give in to any intrusive thoughts that cross his mind.

From Herogasm onward, Homelander resolves to free himself and the superhero community from Vought-American's control. He leads the other superheroes in a coup d'etat against the United States, launching an attack on the White House and killing everyone inside, including the President. During the subsequent confrontation between Homelander and Butcher, the masked Black Noir arrives in the Oval Office and reveals himself to be a clone of Homelander created solely to kill and replace him if he ever went rogue. Gradually being driven insane due to not being allowed to kill Homelander, Noir reveals that he committed the atrocities documented in the photos, including raping Butcher's wife, in order to trick Homelander into thinking he had dissociative identity disorder and pitting Butcher against him, so that Noir would finally be given authorization by the Vought Guy to fulfill his purpose. Outraged, Homelander attacks Black Noir, who proceeds to tear Homelander apart. Before dying, Homelander manages to seriously injure his former teammate, allowing Butcher to later finish him off with a crowbar.

Television series

The Boys (2019–present)
In the television adaptation, Antony Starr plays the Homelander. As interpreted within the television series, he is considered by some reviewers to be analogous to DC's Superman. Grown from Soldier Boy's DNA and having been reared in a laboratory environment to become Homelander, John Gillman displays many sociopathic tendencies and is openly contemptuous of those he considers lesser beings.

He is also possessive, paranoid, vindictive, insensitive, reckless with his powers, and incapable of accepting the possibility of any flaw in his person or decision-making. Unlike in the comic series, Homelander coerced Butcher's wife into having sex with him after she had been assigned as his assistant. However, he left her alive and, though he was unaware of it until the end of the season, pregnant with his son, Ryan. His discovery of the lies surrounding Ryan's existence influences his decision to maim the scientist responsible for his upbringing, Jonah Vogelbaum, and murder Madelyn Stillwell. However, his emotional incompetence and sociopathic traits initially alienate him from his son, and the loss of Stillwell's moderating influence on his behavior unbalances him further. He enters a sexual relationship with Stormfront, despite a difficult beginning, and conspires with her to remove his son from Becca's care and turn the public against "supervillains," creating public outcry for the creation of more superheroes.

Stormfront is critically injured by Homelander's son Ryan, and Maeve blackmails Homelander into letting the boy go and leaving her alone. In a series of television interviews, he is forced to denounce his relationship with Stormfront and apologize for his actions. Partly to moderate Homelander's behavior, CEO Stan Edgar and Vought's board of directors installs Starlight as co-captain of The Seven. However, in response to this, Homelander bribes Edgar's secret adoptive daughter Vic Neuman into opening an investigation into Edgar, ousting him from Vought, with Homelander assuming control of the company himself. He appoints Ashley Barrett as his puppet ruler and antagonizes Starlight by reinstating the Deep as a member of the Seven and falsely announcing that the two are in a relationship during the finale of American Hero; after Starlight denounces Homelander and Vought and abandons her persona as Starlight via a livestream, Homelander says that he dumped her and accuses her of engaging in human trafficking via her charitable foundation, the Starlight House. After learning that Queen Maeve not only acted as an informant for the Boys but also slept with their leader Billy Butcher, Homelander has her detained at Seven Tower with the intention of harvesting her eggs. Homelander would later learn of his connection with Soldier Boy after receiving a call from him. After confirming this connection with Black Noir, Homelander savagely murders the latter. When Homelander attempts to connect with Soldier Boy by introducing him to Ryan and saying that all three of them could be a family, Soldier Boy disowns him as a weak, damaged, attention-seeking disappointment and attempts to kill or depower him (as part of his deal with Butcher); Homelander turns against Soldier Boy after the latter strikes Ryan, but is forced to reluctantly fight Queen Maeve. He publicly introduces his son, Ryan, killing a pro-Starlight protestor in the process, much to the applause of his and Stormfront's supporters.

Seven on 7 (2020–2021)
In the following 2020–2021 promotional web series, Seven on 7 with Cameron Coleman, which bridges the events of the second and third seasons, Homelander continues dealing with the aftermath of Stormfront being revealed to be a Nazi, as well as filming promos for Vought's streaming service, Vought+, and to celebrate Christmas.

Diabolical (2022–present)
In The Boys Presents: Diabolical, Homelander first appears in the final moments of the episode "An Animated Short Where Pissed-Off Supes Kill Their Parents", executing the title characters (escaped Supe teenagers with abnormal powers) on Vought's behalf, after they kill their parents due to the events of The Boys episode "Over the Hill with the Swords of a Thousand Men".

Homelander next appears in the episode "I'm Your Pusher", set in the same continuity as The Boys comic book series, while honouring the Great Wide Wonder during a promotional campaign, Homelander witnesses his drug overdose (induced by Billy Butcher) lead him to crash into Ironcast during a stunt, killing them both. In order to cover for the event, Homelander, Queen Maeve, and Jack From Jupiter blame a "Cold War satellite" controlled by Galaxis for their deaths, claiming it is "hidden in the light of the Sun", which the watching crowd eagerly believe.

In the season finale, the prequel episode "One Plus One Equals Two", a young Homelander makes his debut as a member of the Seven. Flashbacks of his childhood reveal the systematic torture he received from Vought scientists testing the extent of his powers. His superior Madelyn Stillwell, who has been manipulating him, warns him of Black Noir, the "Homelander before Homelander", claiming that he will seek every opportunity to destroy him. Assigned to tackle a hostage situation at a chemical plant ahead of Noir as his first mission as a superhero, Homelander attempts a peaceful resolution; however, after accidentally killing a hostage and injuring the eco-terrorist leader by lasering the latter's broken gun, he kills the remaining eco-terrorists and all but one hostage in a psychotic episode after they collectively berate him for his recklessness. After Black Noir arrives on the scene, Homelander attempts to explain his actions before resolving to kill Noir to cover them up. However, after Noir tricks Homelander into blowing up the compound, he gains his trust by mercy killing the last witness to Homelander's murders in its aftermath, and writes him an excusatory speech to provide to the press outside, claiming the eco-terrorists had a bomb. Later, at Vought headquarters, Homelander tells Stillwell that she was wrong about Noir. Starr reprises his role as Homelander from the live-action series.

Development
The character was designed as an evil version of Superman and Captain America in terms of powerset and costume. His cape pulled to the left resembles the first costume of Captain Marvel a.k.a. Shazam. Homelander's backstory in the original comics is similar to that in the television adaption of The Boys.

Garth Ennis describes Homelander as: "an almost entirely negative character. He is really just a series of unpleasant urges kept in check by his own intelligence, which is enough to understand that he can have anything he wants so long as he doesn't push his luck too far." Also: "It might help to think of the Homelander as having all the self-control of... let’s say... a fourteen-year-old."

The Boys producer and showrunner Eric Kripke has stated that while Homelander can "in theory" be killed, a plot twist which involved the character being killed by his clone Black Noir in the comic book version will not be used in the television adaptation, where Black Noir is instead depicted as a black man and the character's psychopathic traits are amalgamated with Homelander.

Powers and abilities 
The Homelander's powers include heat vision, super strength, durability, flight, and enhanced vocal cords. He also ages more slowly than a normal human, due to Compound V. It is mentioned that his first name is John, with Homelander mentioning to Starlight that he once had an alias or secret identity, but eventually gave it up. In the finale of the first season of the television series, when asked about Homelander's weakness, Madelyn Stillwell claims he does not have one, saying, “There isn't a weapon on Earth that they haven't thrown at him. They've all failed.”

The Homelander's powers and sense of entitlement have led him to exhibit extreme megalomania, causing him to commit crimes against innocent people, including acts of rape and mass murder, out of the idea that he can do anything he wants because of who he is.

Reception
The character and Starr's portrayal in the series received critical acclaim.

The character has been described as the living personification of how the world sees America. Homelander has been compared to Superman and Captain America.

In Other Media 
Metro Boomin samples a portion of Homelander's speech from season three's episode "The Only Man In The Sky" in the track "On Time" from his 2022 album Heroes & Villains.

References

Footnotes

Comics characters introduced in 2006
American comics characters
The Boys characters
Characters created by Garth Ennis
DC Comics American superheroes
DC Comics characters who can move at superhuman speeds
DC Comics characters with accelerated healing
DC Comics characters with superhuman senses
DC Comics characters with superhuman strength
DC Comics supervillains
DC Comics male characters
DC Comics male supervillains
Dynamite Entertainment characters
WildStorm supervillains
Fictional bisexual males
Fictional characters with fire or heat abilities
Fictional characters with nuclear or radiation abilities
Fictional characters with energy-manipulation abilities
Fictional characters with slowed ageing
Fictional characters with superhuman durability or invulnerability
Fictional characters with X-ray vision
Fictional murderers of children
Fictional genetically engineered characters
Fictional rapists
Fictional super soldiers
Fictional mass murderers
LGBT superheroes
LGBT supervillains
Narcissism in fiction
Parodies of Superman
Superheroes who are adopted
United States-themed superheroes
WildStorm characters
WildStorm superheroes